Ambohitanyela is a genus of flat bugs which contains the single species Ambohitanyela yuripopovi from Madagascar.

References

 

Aradidae
Insects of Madagascar
Monotypic Hemiptera genera
Pentatomomorpha genera